Federico Gomes Gerth (born 5 March 2004) is an Argentine footballer who is a goalkeeper for Tigre and the Argentina national under-20 football team.

Early life
He was born in San Isidro, in the northern part of Buenos Aires, and began to play at the Tigre academy from the age of 8. He is nicknamed "Chiquito" despite being close to two metres in height.

Career
He is under contract at Tigre until December 2024. As well as his height being an aid for a goalkeeper, he has a reputation for being a good footballer with the ball at his feet. He is said to be an admirer of Rogério Ceni and Jose Luis Chilavert.

International career
In November 2021 Gomes Gerth was called up to the senior Argentine national squad 
for World Cup qualifying matches against Uruguay and Brazil. He had previously played for the Argentine U17 team.

Gomes Gerth was selected to train and live with the Argentina squad in Qatar at the 2022 FIFA World Cup. He was called the “27th player” in the squad. He said of Lionel Messi “He included me in everything and made me feel part of the achievement.” As well as training with the first team squad as a sparring partner the intention was for him to soak up the experience and learn what it takes to be a goalkeeper at the highest stage.

He was named in the Argentina under-20 squad by Javier Mascherano for the 2023 South American U-20 Championship held in Colombia in January and February 2023.

References

External links

2004 births
Living people
Argentine footballers
Association football goalkeepers
Argentine Primera División players
People from San Isidro, Buenos Aires
Argentina youth international footballers